Raphael "Ralph" Benmergui (born 1955) is a Canadian television and radio personality, a writer, an ordained spiritual director, and a strategic advisor in political, environmental, and academic realms.

Early life and education 

Born to a Sephardi Jewish family in Tangier, Morocco, and raised in Toronto, Benmergui studied journalism at Ryerson Polytechnical Institute, where he was news director and program producer at the university's radio station, CKLN-FM.

Career 

While Benmergui was still at Ryerson, the CBC offered him a research job in Winnipeg. From there, he went on to produce current affairs documentaries and was named host of Night Lines, a late-night music show on CBC Stereo. Back in Toronto, Benmergui hosted Prime Time, a nightly one-hour entertainment program on CBC Radio, and its weekend sister program The Entertainers. He later moved on to co-host CBC Television's Midday with Valerie Pringle, and also later hosted the variety show Friday Night! with Ralph Benmergui and the talk show Benmergui Live.

He has won a prestigious Japan Prize for Best International Youth Programming, a Yorkton Film Festival prize for Best Youth Programming, and has been the recipient of five Gemini Award nominations.

Benmergui produced Stuart McLean's Christmas special and the children's quiz show SmartAsk for CBC television, and for Vision TV he produced five episodes of a series called Seekers, chronicling the experience of five people on journey to find their spirituality, and Ralph Benmergui: My Israel, taking a critical and bipartisan look at the issues and landscape of Israel. He has also hosted three specials, entitled Seriously Funny in Canada and Punchlines in the Sand in the US, where three comics comment on and explore serious issues of the day through comedy.

In 2009, Benmergui joined the Green Party of Canada as a strategic communications advisor. He has since worked as a strategic advisor at different political, environmental, media, business, and academic organizations and boards. He continues to periodically work in media.

In 2021, Benmergui started a podcast for The Canadian Jewish News called Yehupetzville about Jews living in small towns across the country.

Personal life 

Benmergui is married to Cortney Pasternak, a registered psychotherapist, educator, and former television journalist. He is the father of four and the grandfather of two.

References 

1955 births
Living people
People from Tangier
People from Toronto
20th-century Moroccan Jews
Canadian Sephardi Jews
Canadian people of Moroccan-Jewish descent
Canadian television talk show hosts
Canadian television variety show hosts
Canadian television producers
CBC Radio hosts
Canadian political consultants
Moroccan emigrants to Canada
20th-century Sephardi Jews
21st-century Sephardi Jews
Jazz radio presenters
CBC Television people